Chief Patrick Ramaano Mphephu ( 1924 – 17 April 1988) was the first President of the bantustan of Venda, which was granted nominal independence from South Africa on 13 September 1979.

Mphephu was born in Dzanani settlement and after graduating from high school worked for the Johannesburg City Council.  A paramount chief of the Venda people, he was appointed Chairman of the Ramabulana Regional Authority in 1959, Chief Counsellor of the Venda Legislative Assembly on 1 June 1971 and Chief Minister of the two discontiguous territories on 1 February 1973 when South Africa first implemented the black homeland policy.  Mphephu was reelected in elections in August 1973 and his title changed to president upon independence.  As President, he was also leader of the Venda National Party, the only recognized political party in the new state. Mphephu died in office and was replaced by his finance minister, Chief Frank Ravele.

References 

1920s births
1988 deaths
Presidents of Venda
Heads of state of Venda
People from Makhado Local Municipality
South African Venda people